|}
This is a list of Legislative Assembly results for the 2012 Australian Capital Territory general election.

Results by electorate

Brindabella

Ginninderra

Molonglo

See also
Members of the Australian Capital Territory Legislative Assembly, 2012–2016
 List of Australian Capital Territory elections

References

2012